The Cowboy and the Lady is a 1911 American silent Western film notable for being Alan Hale Sr.'s screen debut.

References

1911 films
1911 Western (genre) films
1911 short films
American black-and-white films
American silent short films
Silent American Western (genre) films
1910s American films
1910s English-language films